Kendriya Vidyalaya, Kanjikode, officially Kendriya Vidyalaya No.2 Palakkad, is a Senior Secondary School (Std 1-12) affiliated to the Central Board of Secondary Education (CBSE), New Delhi and functions under the purview of Kendriya Vidyalaya Sangathan (KVS), an autonomous government body.

History 
The Vidyalaya started functioning in a temporary building at Sathrapadi, Kanjikode in 1986. Later the campus was shifted to the present location on Malampuzha Road, Kanjikode in 1991 to the land sponsored by M/s. Instrumentation Limited, Kanjikode. Class XII students passed out during the years 1991 and 1993 respectively. Presently the vidyalaya has got a strength of more than 2150 students and staff strength of 58 including Principal, teaching and non teaching members. The vidyalaya was designated as model Kendriya Vidyalaya in 1999–2000.Later on, it was termed “Pilot KV” . It has been selected as mother rlink KV to award computer literacy, free of cost, to the children of the neighboring schools run by the state government. KV Kanjikode was ranked among the Top 10 Best Govt Day School in the country by Education World in 2016 and 2017.

The new Annex for the Vidyalaya was inaugurated on 29 March 2012. The new annex has got 12 class rooms and 6 departments.

Infrastructure facilities

Multipurpose hall 
A new multipurpose hall was built in the year 2007 for organizing special programmes and conducting various activities

e-Classrooms 
The Vidyalaya has 25 e-Classrooms equipped with interactive board and multimedia projectors.

Computer laboratories 
The Vidyalaya has separate Computer labs for the primary, secondary and senior secondary sections well equipped with 24 hour broadband Internet connectivity and UPS backup. The entire campus has Wi-Fi facility.

Children's Park and Science Park 
Renovated the Children's Park Science Park and a Science Park was installed in the Vidyalaya in the year 2013.

Sports facilities 
Vidyalaya has facilities for table tennis, badminton, volleyball, kho-kho, kabaddi and basketball. A new basketball court was built which was inaugurated by Sri. C Karunakaran, AC, KVS RO Ernakulam in July 2015.

Library 
School library is one of the best school libraries in the country. The library has a collection of 12, 000 books and subscribes to 52 periodicals. The library was shortlisted for LibTech Award 2019 for best integration of technology and won Indian Reading Olympiad 2021 Award under Reading for Pleasure - School category for the innovative practices for motivating reading. The library also won KVS National Innovation & Experimentation Award 2019 for the innovative project "Library Points: Rewarding the Readers".

The E-learning and Digital Library, launched in 2020, is the first of its kind in the country providing online reading and learning content to the students.

Achievements 
Kendriya Vidyalaya Kanjikode ranked 7th in the EducationWorld India School Rankings 2017.

References

Kendriya Vidyalayas in Kerala
Educational institutions established in 1986
Schools in Palakkad district
1986 establishments in Kerala